JKT may refer to:
 Jacobus Kapteyn Telescope
 Jakarta, Indonesia
 Kemayoran Airport, a former airport serving Jakarta
 Jakarta Time; see Time in Indonesia
 Jetstar Hong Kong
 Jonathan Kreiss-Tomkins (born 1989), American politician
 JKT48, an Indonesian idol group
 John Kilpatrick Turnpike, a toll road that forms the northern and western quadrants of the Oklahoma City beltway